The mixed NOC team figure skating competition of the 2020 Winter Youth Olympics was held at the Lausanne Skating Arena on 15 January 2020. The eight teams were composed of one men's single skater, one ladies' single skater, one pair, and one ice dancing duo, each performing a free program or free dance.

Teams
The skaters who took part the team trophy was determined by draw.

Results
In the case of a winner of the competition, the tie breaking procedure was used, taking into consideration the two best places of the concerned teams in different categories. The highest total points from the two best places prevailed and the respective placings was recorded accordingly. In the case of a 4th place the ties persisted. In this case the three best places in different categories was considered and the highest total scores from the three best places prevailed and the respective placings was recorded accordingly.

Detailed results

Ice dancing

Pairs

Ladies

Men

References

Team trophy